The 1971 edition of the Campeonato Carioca kicked off on March 6, 1971 and ended on June 27, 1971. It was organized by FCF (Federação Carioca de Futebol, or Carioca Football Federation). Twelve teams participated. Fluminense won the title for the 20th time. no teams were relegated.

System
The tournament would be divided in two stages:
 First round: The twelve teams were divided into two groups, each team playing in a single round-robin format against the teams of the other group. The four best teams in each group qualified to the Second round.
 Final phase: The remaining eight teams all played in a double round-robin format against each other. The team with the most points won the title.

The regulations also had stipulated that the qualification for the National Championship later that year would be partially defined by revenue, with the four teams with the best revenue qualifying along with the champion. The qualification for the Taça Guanabara would also follow similar criteria. However, that criterion proved controversial, as Olaria began complaining about the federation supposedly favouring its competitors, América and Bangu, and eventually that criterion was scrapped altogether, after the retail chain  bought all the tickets for Olaria's last home match against Flamengo, in Maracanã, guaranteeing Olaria fifth place in the revenue ranking and prompting protests from América and Bangu. In the end, América was invited to the National Championship in the place of Olaria, who withdrew from the Taça Guanabara as well.

Championship

First round

Group A

Group B

Final round

Taça Guanabara

References

Campeonato Carioca seasons
Carioca